Cícero João de Cézare (born 24 June 1980), nicknamed Cicinho, is a Brazilian retired professional footballer who played as a right back.

He had his breakthrough at São Paulo, where he was named in the 2005 Bola de Prata as the team won the Campeonato Paulista, Copa Libertadores and FIFA Club World Cup. He then spent most of his career with mixed successes at Real Madrid, Roma and Sivasspor. He suffered from alcoholism during his time in Europe.

Cicinho earned 15 caps for Brazil, winning the 2005 FIFA Confederations Cup and going to the 2006 FIFA World Cup.

Club career

Early career
Born in Pradópolis, São Paulo, Cicinho began his career at Botafogo-SP before joining Atlético Mineiro, who loaned him to the Rio de Janeiro-based Botafogo. He won the Club World Cup in 2005 while playing for São Paulo.

Real Madrid
After an interview with Sir Alex Ferguson at Manchester United, Cicinho signed for Real Madrid on 23 August 2005, effective from the new year. He joined for an undisclosed fee and accompanied compatriots Ronaldo, Robinho, Júlio Baptista and Roberto Carlos, under Brazilian manager Vanderlei Luxemburgo.

He made his debut in La Liga on 8 January 2006, replacing the injured Ronaldo after 33 minutes in a goalless draw at Villarreal, and three weeks later, he scored his first goal to open a 2–1 win at Celta de Vigo. On 14 February, he scored after 57 seconds in a 4–0 win over Real Zaragoza in the semi-finals of the Copa del Rey, to no avail due to a 6–1 loss in the first round.

In September 2006, Cicinho suffered an extensive injury to his ACL and missed over six months. His comeback, to not only the pitch, but also the starting lineup, was on 29 April 2007, against Athletic Bilbao. He assisted Ruud van Nistelrooy's first goal with a cross, and played a part in the Dutchman's second goal in a 4–1 win.

In preparation for the 2007–08 season, Cicinho received less playing time under new coach Bernd Schuster. Michel Salgado and Sergio Ramos were used on the right during most of pre-season, and he therefore requested a transfer to A.S. Roma who had been following him for some time.

Roma
On 22 August 2007, Cicinho signed for Roma for a fee up to €11 million. Cicinho signed a five-year contract with the capital club worth from €3.6M in the first year up to €4 million in the last year (in gross salary, i.e. include tax), with additional bonuses.

He made his official debut in a Roma jersey on the first matchday of Serie A against Palermo, as a substitute for Ludovic Giuly in the second half. Roma went on to win the game 2–0.

On 9 February 2010, Cicinho joined São Paulo on loan until on 30 June 2010. This loan came after a 2009–10 season in which Cicinho received less playing time under new manager Claudio Ranieri in favor of Marco Cassetti and Marco Motta.

On 13 January 2011, he returned to Spain; this time joining Villarreal on loan until the end of the season.

In 2011–12 season Cicinho returned to Roma. He was the third choice for right back behind Marco Cassetti and Aleandro Rosi. He played only 2 matches in a 2011–12 season, first against Siena and second against Fiorentina in which he was a starter. His contract expired on 30 June, and he returned to Brazil.

Later career
Cicinho returned to Brazil after six years away on 21 June 2012, signing a one-year contract for Sport as part of president Gustavo Dubeux's promise to bring in a player who would be "greeted by the fans at the airport".

In July 2013, Cicinho signed with Turkish club Sivasspor, managed by his former club and international defensive partner Roberto Carlos. After one year, Cicinho had become a key player, and, in April 2014, he renewed his contract for two more years.

In September 2017, after over a year of unemployment, Cicinho signed with Brasiliense of Série D for the 2018 season. He rescinded his contract on 1 March, after two competitive games for the team from Brasília, due to a recurring knee injury.

International career

Cicinho made his debut for Brazil national team on 27 April 2005 in a 3–0 win over Guatemala at the Estádio do Pacaembu for Romário's testimonial match, assisting the opening goal by Ânderson.

He was called up for the 2005 FIFA Confederations Cup in Germany, with he and Léo replacing veteran full-backs Cafu and Roberto Carlos respectively. He played every match as Brazil won.

On 12 November 2005, Cicinho came on as a substitute for Cafú in a friendly against the United Arab Emirates in Abu Dhabi and scored his only international goal to cap an 8–0 victory.

He was one of the 23 players called up by Carlos Alberto Parreira to defend Brazil's crown in the 2006 FIFA World Cup in Germany. He made his tournament debut in the 4–1 group stage win over Japan, assisting one of Ronaldo's goals that made him the tournament's all-time top goalscorer. His one other appearance was in the 1–0 loss to France in the quarter-finals, as a late substitute for Cafú.

Personal life

In addition to being Brazilian, he is also an Italian citizen, having a grandfather from Tione degli Abruzzi in Abruzzo whose last name was "De Cesare", then poorly transcribed as De Cézare by the registry office.

In 2012, Cicinho revealed that he was an alcoholic and smoker, and would have taken drugs were it not for doping tests in football. He told ESPN Brasil in 2016 that he smoked two packs of cigarettes a day. The following year, he confessed in a Fox interview that his addictions became a problem following his move to Real Madrid, and that he got more than 30 tattoos in a struggle to fight his depression.

Career statistics

Honours

Club
São Paulo
Campeonato Paulista: 2005
Copa Libertadores: 2005
FIFA Club World Cup: 2005

Real Madrid
La Liga: 2006–07

Roma
Coppa Italia: 2007–08

International
Brazil
FIFA Confederations Cup: 2005

References

External links

Sivasspor profile 

1980 births
Living people
Brazilian people of Italian descent
People from Ribeirão Preto
Footballers from São Paulo (state)
Brazilian footballers
Association football fullbacks
Botafogo Futebol Clube (SP) players
Clube Atlético Mineiro players
Botafogo de Futebol e Regatas players
São Paulo FC players
Real Madrid CF players
A.S. Roma players
Villarreal CF players
Sport Club do Recife players
Sivasspor footballers
Brasiliense Futebol Clube players
Campeonato Brasileiro Série A players
La Liga players
Serie A players
Süper Lig players
Brazil international footballers
2005 FIFA Confederations Cup players
2006 FIFA World Cup players
Copa Libertadores-winning players
FIFA Confederations Cup-winning players
Brazilian expatriate footballers
Brazilian expatriate sportspeople in Italy
Brazilian expatriate sportspeople in Spain
Brazilian expatriate sportspeople in Turkey
Expatriate footballers in Italy
Expatriate footballers in Spain
Expatriate footballers in Turkey